Naoki Izumiya (born 9 August 1948) is a Japanese businessman and the president and CEO of Asahi Breweries. He joined the company in 1972, became president in 2010, and was elevated to CEO and chairman in 2016.

References

1948 births
Living people
Japanese chief executives